Ballou may refer to:

Places

United States
 Ballou, Illinois, an unincorporated community
 Ballou, Ohio, an unincorporated community
 Ballou, Oklahoma, a census-designated place
 Ballou, Wisconsin, an unincorporated community
 Ballou High School in Washington, D.C.

Elsewhere
 Mount Ballou, Victoria Land, Antarctica
 Ballou, Senegal

People

In arts and media

Writers
 Addie L. Ballou (1837–1916), American suffragist, poet, artist, author and lecturer
 Ella Maria Ballou (1852-1937), American stenographer, reporter, essayist, and educator
 Emily Ballou, Australian-American poet, novelist and screenwriter
 Hosea Ballou (1771–1852), American clergyman and theological writer
 Joyce Ballou Gregorian (1946–1991), American author
 Mary Ballou (1809–1904), American memoirist
 Maturin Murray Ballou (1820–1895), writer and publisher

Musicians
 Dave Ballou, American musician
 Esther Ballou (1915–1973), American musician and composer
 Kurt Ballou (born 1974), American guitarist with the band Converge

In other arts
 Bud Ballou (1942–1977), American radio personality
 Michael Ballou, American artist
 Tyson Ballou (born 1976), fashion model

In education and academia
 Clinton Ballou (born 1923), American biochemist
 David Ballou, American chemist and professor
 Ella Maria Ballou (1852-1937), American stenographer, reporter, essayist, and educator
 Frank Ballou (1879–1955), American school administrator
 Hosea Ballou II (1796–1861), first president of Tufts University, grand-nephew of clergyman Hosea Ballou

In politics
 Addie L. Ballou (1837–1916), American suffragist, poet, artist, author and lecturer
 Adin Ballou (1803–1890), American pacifist
 Latimer Whipple Ballou (1812–1900), American politician
 Maude Ballou (1925-2009), American Civil Rights activist
 Phineas D. Ballou (1823–1877), American businessperson and politician
 Sidney M. Ballou (1870–1929), American judge
 Sullivan Ballou (1829–1861), American politician

In sport
 Adam Ballou (born 1992), American Paralympic soccer player
 Ballou Tabla (born 1999), Canadian soccer player
 Mike Ballou (born 1947), American football player
 Win Ballou (1897–1963), American Major League Baseball pitcher

Others
 Adin Ballou Underwood (1828–1888), American army officer
 Hosea Ballou (1771–1852), American clergyman and theological writer

Other uses
 The title character of Cat Ballou, a 1965 comedy western film

See also
 Ballouville, Connecticut
 Baloo, a main character in Rudyard Kipling's story collection The Jungle Book
 Palwankar Baloo (1876–1955), Indian cricketer